Interferon regulatory factor 6 also known as IRF6 is a protein that in humans is encoded by the IRF6 gene.

Function 
This gene encodes a member of the interferon regulatory transcription factor (IRF) family. Family members share a highly conserved N-terminal helix-turn-helix DNA-binding domain and a less conserved C-terminal protein-binding domain. The function of IRF6 is related to the formation of connective tissue, for example that of the palate.  This gene encodes a member of the interferon regulatory transcription factor (IRF) family. In addition, it has been observed that IRF6 gene is under epigenetic regulation by promoter methylation.

Pathology 
A mutation of the IRF6 gene can lead to the autosomal dominant van der Woude syndrome (VWS)  or the related popliteal pterygium syndrome (PPS).  Van der Woude syndrome can include cleft lip and palate features along with dental anomalies and lip fistulas. In addition, common alleles in IRF6 have also been associated with non-syndromic cases of cleft lip and/or palate through genome-wide association studies and in many candidate gene studies. These disorders are caused by mutations in the IRF6 gene and some of the phenotypic heterogeneity is due to different types of IRF6 mutations.
One explanation  for this phenotypic variation between syndromes is based on a differential impact on the structure of the dimerized mutant proteins. VWS mutations appear to result in haploinsufficiency while PPS mutations may be dominant negative in nature. The spectrum of mutations in VWS and PPS has been recently summarized. IRF6 has been shown to play a critical role in keratinocyte development. A role for IRF6 in the common forms of cleft lip and palate has also been demonstrated and may explain ~20% of cases of cleft lip only. Variants in IRF6 have yielded consistent evidence of association with syndromic cleft and/or palate across multiple studies. A study by Birnbaum and colleagues in 2009 confirmed the impact of this gene on the etiology of cleft lip and/or palate, and the GENEVA Cleft Consortium study, which studied families from multiple populations, reconfirmed the findings that IRF6 mutations are strongly associated with cleft and/or palate.  A role of IRF6 in causing cleft lip and/or palate is further supported by analysis of IRF6 mutant mice which exhibit a hyper-proliferative epidermis that fails to undergo terminal differentiation, leading to multiple epithelial adhesions that can occlude the oral cavity and result in cleft palate. Research on animal models indicate IRF6 determines keratinocyte proliferation and also has a key role in the formation of oral periderm. Recently, through utilization of mouse genetics, gene expression analyses, chromatin immunoprecipitation studies and luciferase reporter assays, it has been shown that IRF6 is a direct target of p63, which underlies several malformation syndromes that include cleft features, and p63 activates IRF6 transcription through the IRF6 enhancer element.  Variation in the enhancer element increases susceptibility to cleft lip only. Both cleft lip with or without a cleft palate and cleft palate only features have been seen in families with an IRF6 mutation. In addition, different types of clefts can segregate within the same family.

Epigenetics 

The IRF6 aberrant promoter DNA hypermethylation has been observed associated with cancer onset/progression. Indeed, this improper epigenetic phenomenon has been observed in women affected by Vulvar Squamous cell carcinoma arose from vulver lichen sclerosus. Methylation of the IRF6 promoter may be a marker of cancer risk in patients affected by this disease.

Cancer 
IRF6 gene has been observed progressively downregulated in Human papillomavirus-positive neoplastic keratinocytes derived from uterine cervical preneoplastic lesions at different levels of malignancy. For this reason, this gene is likely to be associated with tumorigenesis and may be a potential prognostic marker for uterine cervical preneoplastic lesions progression. Similarly, IRF6 has been found to be genetically and epigenetically disregulated in Vulvar cancer.

See also 
 Interferon regulatory factors

References

External links 
  GeneReview/NIH/UW entry on IRF6-Related Disorders
 
 
 

Transcription factors